NGC 1530 is a barred spiral galaxy in the northern constellation of Camelopardalis. It was discovered by German astronomer W. Tempel in 1876. Danish astronomer J. L. E. Dreyer in 1888 described it only as large and pretty bright. The plane of the galactic disk is inclined at an angle of 55° to the line of sight from the Earth. This galaxy is located at an estimated distance of  million light years, with a recessional velocity of  relative to the Milky Way galaxy.

NGC 1530 has a morphological classification of type SB(rs)bc in the de Vaucouleurs system, which means it is a barred spiral galaxy (SB) with a transitional outer ring structure (rs) that joins somewhat loosely wound arms (bc). Star formation is particularly high in the nucleus region and at the ends of the bar, but weak in between these locations. This activity appears to be taking place primarily on the trailing side of the bar where gas pressure is highest. Two linear dust lanes are visible along the bar, which outline shock fronts in the flow of gas.

The central region has over 25% of the free gaseous hydrogen in the galaxy. There was some suggestion that the galaxy has a second, inner bar, but this instead appears to be an inner spiral structure. This spiral has one arm brighter than the other, appearing lopsided.

References

Further reading

Barred spiral galaxies
NGC objects
Camelopardalis (constellation)
Astronomical objects discovered in 1876